Michel Aflaq (‎, 9 January 1910 – 23 June 1989) was a Syrian philosopher, sociologist and Arab nationalist. His ideas played a significant role in the development of Ba'athism and its political movement; he is considered by several Ba'athists to be the principal founder of Ba'athist thought. He published various books during his lifetime, the most notable being The Battle for One Destiny (1958) and The Struggle Against Distorting the Movement of Arab Revolution (1975).

Born into a middle-class family in Damascus, Syria, Aflaq studied at the Sorbonne, where he met his future political companion Salah al-Din al-Bitar. He returned to Syria in 1932, and began his political career in communist politics. Aflaq became a communist activist, but broke his ties with the communist movement when the Syrian–Lebanese Communist Party supported colonial policies through the Popular Front under the French Mandate of Syria. Later in 1940 Aflaq and al-Bitar established the Arab Ihya Movement (later renaming itself the Arab Ba'ath Movement, taking the name from Zaki al-Arsuzi's group by the same name). The movement proved successful, and in 1947 the Arab Ba'ath Movement merged with al-Arsuzi's Arab Ba'ath organisation to establish the Arab Ba'ath Party. Aflaq was elected to the party's executive committee and was elected "'Amid" (meaning the party's leader).

The Arab Ba'ath Party merged with Akram al-Hawrani's Arab Socialist Party to establish the Arab Socialist Ba'ath Party in 1952; Aflaq was elected the party's leader in 1954. During the mid-to-late 1950s the party began developing relations with Gamal Abdel Nasser, the President of Egypt, which eventually led to the establishment of the United Arab Republic (UAR). Nasser forced Aflaq to dissolve the party, which he did, but without consulting with party members. Shortly after the UAR's dissolution, Aflaq was reelected as Secretary General of the National Command of the Ba'ath Party. Following the 8th of March Revolution, Aflaq's position within the party was weakened to such an extent that he was forced to resign as the party's leader in 1965. Aflaq was ousted during the 1966 Syrian coup d'état, which led to a schism within the Ba'ath Party. He escaped to Lebanon, but later went to Iraq. In 1968 Aflaq was elected Secretary General of the Iraqi-led Ba'ath Party; during his tenure he held no de facto power. He held the post until his death on 23 June 1989.

Aflaq's theories about society, economics, and politics, which are collectively known as Ba'athism, hold that the Arab world needs to be unified into one Arab Nation in order to achieve an advanced state of development. He was critical of both capitalism and communism, and critical of Karl Marx's view of dialectical materialism as the only truth. Ba'athist thought placed much emphasis on liberty and Arab socialism – a socialism with Arab characteristics, which was not part of the international socialist movement as defined by the West. Aflaq believed in the separation of state and religion, and was a strong believer in secularisation, but was against atheism. Although a Christian, he believed Islam to be proof of "Arab genius". In the aftermath of the 1966 Ba'ath Party split, the Syrian-led Ba'ath Party accused Aflaq of stealing al-Arsuzi's ideas, calling him a "thief" and later sentenced him to "death via absentia" in 1971. The Iraqi-led Ba'ath Party rejects this, and does not believe that al-Arsuzi contributed to Ba'athist thought.

Early life 
Born on 9 January 1910 in Damascus to a middle class  Orthodox Christian family, his father, Joseph, working as a grain merchant. Aflaq was first educated in the westernized schools of the French Mandate of Syria. In 1929, he left Syria to study philosophy abroad at the Sorbonne in Paris. During his stay Aflaq was influenced by the works of Henri Bergson, and met his longtime collaborator Salah al-Din al-Bitar, a fellow Syrian nationalist. Aflaq founded an Arab Student Union at the Sorbonne, and discovered the writings of Karl Marx. He returned to Syria in 1932, and became active in communist politics, but left the movement when the government of Léon Blum, supported by the French Communist Party (FCP), continued France's old politics towards its colonies. Aflaq, and others, had believed that the FCP followed pro-independence policies towards the French colonies. It had not helped that the Syrian–Lebanese Communist Party (SLCP) supported the FCP's decision. From then on Aflaq saw the communist movement as a tool of the Soviet Union. He was impressed by the organisation and ideology of Antun Saadeh's Syrian Social Nationalist Party.

Political career

Arab Ba'ath Movement: 1940–1947 

Upon their return to Syria, Aflaq and al-Bitar became teachers at Tajhiz all'-Ula, "the most prestigious secondary school in Syria". Aflaq taught history, while al-Bitar taught math and physics. By 1940, Aflaq and al-Bitar had managed to set up a student circle, which usually met on Fridays. That year, the Arab Ihya Movement, a political party, was established by Aflaq and al-Bitar. They used most of their spare time in 1941 to agitate for the party. It was in 1942 that Aflaq showed his skills as "a compelling speaker" who was able to utilize the "theatrical pause" to great effect. The party changed its name to Arab Ba'ath Movement to signify the radical changes which were sweeping the Middle East; Rashid Ali al-Gaylani, the Prime Minister of Iraq, had challenged Britain's domination over Iraq. The replacement of the word "Revival" with "Ba'ath" (literally means resurrection/rebirth) signified that Arab revival had been replaced ideologically by the need for an Arab rebirth. The change of name led to Zaki al-Arsuzi, leader of the Arab Ba'ath Party, to accuse Aflaq and al-Bitar of stealing his party's name from him. Though both men were promoting a party platform based on an Arab nationalist stance, Aflaq and al-Arsuzi became bitter rivals.

On 24 October 1942, both Aflaq and al-Bitar resigned from their teaching positions, now determined to devote themselves fully to the political struggle. In 1941 the Syrian Committee to Help Iraq was established to support the Iraqi Government led by Rashid Ali al-Gaylani against the British invasion during the Anglo–Iraqi War. Al-Arsuzi, the leader of the other Arab Ba'ath movement, was skeptical of the new committee, and opposed helping the Iraqis on the ground that they would lose anyway. In 1941 the movement began publishing documents under the name the "Arab Ihya Movement". Later, in 1945, Aflaq and al-Bitar asked the French Mandate authorities to grant the movement a party license. The Arab Ba'ath movement did not become an official party until 1947, when it merged with al-Arsuzi's Arab Ba'ath Movement to found the Arab Ba'ath Party. The Arab Ba'ath Movement, led by Aflaq and al-Bitar, drew supporters from al-Arsuzi's Ba'ath Movement; during the 1940s, al-Arsuzi started to seclude himself from the public eye, he developed a deep distrust of others and became, according to some of his associates, paranoid. When the two Ba'ath movements merged and established the Arab Ba'ath Party in 1947, the only subject discussed was how much socialism to include; Wahib al-Ghanim and Jalal al-Sayyid from the al-Arsuzi led Ba'ath movement wanted Aflaq and al-Bitar to adopt more radical socialist policies.

Founding and early years 
The Arab Ba'ath Party's first congress was held in Damascus in 1947. Aflaq took the pre-eminent position of Amid, sometimes translated as 'doyen' or as 'leader'; and was elected to a four-member executive committee. Under the constitution adopted at the congress, this made him effective leader of the party, with sweeping powers within the organisation; al-Bitar was elected Secretary General of the National Command. Zaki al-Arsuzi, the leader of the Arab Ba'ath, was not given any position, or membership in the party. Aflaq as Amid was responsible for ideological affairs and became the party's mentor, while al-Bitar controlled the party's day-to-day management. The merger would prove problematic, several members of the al-Arsuzi-led Ba'ath Party were more left-leaning, and would become, later in Aflaq's tenure as leader, highly critical of his leadership.

In the late 1940s, Aflaq and al-Bitar gave free lessons on Ba'athist thought, and in 1948 they established the newspaper al-Ba'ath (English: rebirth/resurrection). Aflaq tested the Ba'ath Party's strength during the 1948 Arab–Israeli War after early Syrian defeats – he led several demonstrations against the government led by President Shukri al-Quwatli. He personally led demonstrations, and claimed that al-Quwatli, a landowner, was a corrupt and capitalistic politician, who was to blame for the Syrians army's defeat. Aflaq called for al-Quwatli's resignation, and wrote several al-Ba'ath articles criticising his presidency and his prime minister, Jamil Mardam Bey. Aflaq was later arrested on the orders of al-Quwatli's prime minister Bey. Al-Quwali's government was brought down in a coup d'état led by military officer Husni al-Za'im. Al-Za'im banned all parties, claiming that Syria was not ready to establish a liberal democracy yet. Aflaq, who had been set free, was rearrested during al-Zai'm's presidency and sent to the notorious Mezzeh Prison. Al-Za'im's rule did not last for long, and in August 1949, he was toppled, and Hashim al-Atassi, who was democratically elected, took his place. Al-Atassi established a national unity government, and Aflaq was appointed to the post of Minister of Education, the only government post he would ever hold; he held it from August to December 1949. Al-Attasi's presidency did not last for very long either, and in 1951 Adib Shishakli took power in a military coup.

Aflaq at first extended his support to the new government, believing that he and the Ba'ath Party could collaborate with Shishakli because they shared the same Arab nationalist sentiments. His analysis of Shishakli proved to be wrong, and one of Shishakli's first decisions as ruler was to ban all political parties, including the Ba'ath Party. The Ba'ath Party leadership, and several leading members, escaped to Lebanon in the wake of increased government repression. In Lebanon Aflaq and al-Bitar agreed to a merger of the Arab Ba'ath Party and the Arab Socialist Party (ASP), led by Akram al-Hawrani, to establish the Arab Socialist Ba'ath Party in 1952. The newly formed party worked as a base of operation against Shishali's rule – Aflaq and the rest cooperated with non-Ba'athist opposition forces too. Shishakli was toppled in February 1954.

Power politics: 1954–1963 

Following the overthrow of al-Shishakli, Syria held its first democratic elections in five years. The Ba'ath Party, led by Aflaq, al-Bitar and al-Hawrani, had 22 members elected to parliament. This increase in influence can largely be attributed to al-Hawrani – several old ASP strongholds voted for the Ba'ath Party because of al-Hawrani's presence. By this time Aflaq was losing much of his power to al-Hawrani and his supporters, who were in a majority in the party. A proof of this was the decision of the Ba'ath Party to collaborate openly with the Syrian Communist Party (SCP), a move Aflaq opposed. Aflaq was elected the party's Secretary General of the newly established National Command, a title equivalent to 'party leader', by the party's Second National Congress.

When, under the United Arab Republic (UAR), Aflaq was forced by Nasser to dissolve the party, he disbanded the party by himself, instead of convening a congress on the matter. The UAR proved to be disastrous for the Ba'ath Party – the party was sidelined to a great extent by Nasser's government. The Ba'ath movement, which was on the verge in 1958 of becoming the dominant Arab nationalist movement, found itself in disarray after three years of Nasserist rule. Only a handful of Ba'athists were given public office in the UAR's government, al-Hawrani became vice president and al-Bitar became Minister of Culture and Guidance. Several members, mostly young, blamed Aflaq for this situation; it was he who dissolved the party in 1958 without consulting the National Congress. Hafez al-Assad and Salah Jadid amongst others, eventually established the Military Committee to save the Syrian Ba'ath movement from annihilation. The party's Third National Congress in 1959 supported Aflaq's decision to dissolve the party, but a 1960 National Congress, in which Jadid was a delegate representing the then-unknown Military Committee, reversed the decision and called for the Ba'ath Party's reestablishment. The Congress also decided to improve relations with Nasser by democratising the UAR from within. A faction within the party, led by al-Hawrani, called for Syria's secession. When the UAR broke up in 1961, some members applauded the dissolution, among them was al-Bitar.

The Ba'ath Party captured 20 seats, down from 22, in the 1961 election. In 1962, after four years, Aflaq convened the Fifth Congress in Homs. Al-Hawrani was not invited; cells that had stayed active and defied Aflaq's orders, and Ba'athists who become Nasserists during the period of the UAR, were not invited to the congress. Aflaq was reelected the National Command's secretary general, and ordered the reestablishment of the Syrian-regional Ba'ath organisation. During the congress, Aflaq and the Military Committee, through Muhammad Umran, made contact for the first time; the committee asked for permission to initiate a coup d'état; Aflaq supported the conspiracy. Following the success of the February 1963 Iraqi coup d'état, led by the Ba'ath Party's Iraqi Regional Branch, the Military Committee hastily convened to hatch a coup against Nazim al-Kudsi's presidency. The 8th of March Revolution, a military coup launched in 1963, proved successful, and a Ba'athist government in Syria was established. The plotters first order was to establish the National Council of the Revolutionary Command (NCRC), consisting entirely of Ba'athists and Nasserists, and controlled by military personnel rather than civilians from the very beginning.

The beginning: 1963–1964 

The relationship between the Ba'athists and the Nasserists were at best, uncomfortable. The Ba'ath Party's rise to power in Iraq and Syria put Nasser, as he put it, "between the hammer and the anvil". The establishment of a union between Iraq and Syria would weaken his credentials as a pan-Arab leader. Nasser started launching bitter propaganda attacks against the party; Aflaq was dismissed as an ineffectual theorist who was mocked as a puppet "Roman emperor" and accused of being a "Cypriot Christian". In several Ba'ath Party meetings Aflaq responded with pure anger, and became an anti-Nasserist. Because of the position he took, Aflaq had a falling out with al-Bitar who still believed there was a chance to reestablish good ties with Nasser.

The break with Nasser weakened the original leaders of the Ba'ath Party, which in turn gave the Military Committee room to expand. After taking power, the Military Committee looked for theoretical guidance, but instead of going to Aflaq to solve problems (which was usual before), they contacted the party's Marxist faction led by Hammud al-Shufi. At the Syrian Ba'athist Regional Congress, the Military Committee "proved" that it was rebelling equally against Aflaq and the traditional leadership, as against their moderate social and economic policies. The Military Committee was bent on removing Aflaq from a position of power, believing that he had become old and frail.
At the Sixth National Congress held in October 1963, Aflaq was barely able to hold on to his post as Secretary General – the Marxist factions led by al-Shufi and Ali Salih al-Sa'di, in Syria and Iraq respectively, were the majority group. Another problem facing Aflaq was that several of his colleagues were not elected to party office, for instance al-Bitar was not reelected to a seat in the National Command. Instead of the traditional civilian leadership, a new leadership consisting of military officers was gradually growing; Jadid and Amin al-Hafiz from Syria and Ahmed Hassan al-Bakr and Salih Mahdi Ammash from Iraq were elected to the National Command. While the Military Committee was in fact taking control over the Ba'ath Party from the civilian leadership, they were sensitive to such criticism, and stated, in an ideological pamphlet, that civilian-military symbiosis was of major importance, if socialist reconstruction was to be achieved. To the outside world Aflaq seemed to be in charge. As the Tunisian newspaper  put it; "The philosopher who made two coups [Iraqi and Syrian coups] in a month".

The Ba'ath movement was not running as smoothly as the rest of the world believed; the Iraqi Regional Branch was already starting to lose membership. The Iraqi military and the party's militant arm, the National Guard, detested each other. Al-Sadi, the Regional Secretary of the Iraqi Regional Branch, was eventually exiled to Madrid, Spain on 11 November by several military officers and moderate Ba'athists. An anxious Aflaq hastily traveled from Syria and dissolved the Regional Command of the Iraqi Regional Branch, exclaiming that the National Command would rule Iraq in its place until a new Regional Command was elected. This was not greeted warmly by the majority of Iraqi military officers and Ba'athists – the idea that a Christian was to rule over a Muslim country was considered "insensitive".

The situation in Iraq did not improve, Abdul Salam Arif, the President of Iraq and a Nasserist, plotted a coup against the Ba'ath Party on 18 November, which succeeded. The dream of cornering Nasser's pan-Arab project was over; instead, it was Nasser and the Nasserists who were cornering the Ba'ath movement. On hearing the news, Aflaq and several Ba'athists fled Iraq for Syria.

The schism: 1964–1965 
After a falling out with the Military Committee, of which he was a member, Muhammad Umran told Aflaq about the committee's secret plans to oust the civilian leadership, led by Aflaq, and take over the Ba'ath Party. Shortly after, Umran was sent into exile as Ambassador to Spain for supporting the Aflaq faction. Aflaq responded to the threat posed to his leadership by invoking his office as secretary general, and calling for the National Command to dissolve the Regional Command. He was forced to withdraw his request, when the majority of Ba'ath Party members proved to oppose such a move. A contest for power, between Aflaq and the Military Committee, ensued in the open; but it was a struggle Aflaq was losing. It was plain from the very beginning that the initiative lay with the anti-Aflaq forces. To counter the military threat, Aflaq invoked party rules and regulations against them. To counter this, the Military Committee befriended a staunchly anti-Aflaq civilian faction calling themselves the "Regionalists" – this group had not dissolved their party organisations as ordered by Aflaq in the 1950s.

The Regional Congress of the Syrian Regional Branch, in March 1965, devolved power from the center, the National Command, to the Regional Command. From then on, the Regional Secretary of the Regional Command was considered Syria's ex officio head of state. The Regional Secretary had the power to appoint the Prime Minister, the cabinet, the chief of staff and top military commanders. Aflaq was unsettled by the way things were moving, and in May he convened the Eighth National Congress to get a showdown between his followers and those of the Military Committee. However, this never came to fruition. Several civilian members of the National Command, such as the Lebanese Jibran Majdalani and the Saudi Ali Ghannam, advised caution, believing that if he pressed the Military Committee too hard the military would take over the Syrian Regional Branch, and then the Ba'ath Party—as had happened in Iraq following the ousting of the Iraqi Regional Branch.
Because of their concerns, Aflaq kept quiet. But to his astonishment, keeping quiet caused him to lose his post as Secretary General – Aflaq was succeeded as Secretary General of the National Command by Munif al-Razzaz, a Jordanian of Syrian origin. However, the power between the two camps was unexpectedly reshuffled when Amin al-Hafiz defected to Aflaq's camp. In contrast to other military officers al-Hafiz had very little influence within or outside the party. Al-Hafiz's defection led to a resurgence of activity within Aflaq's faction, al-Bitar and Umran were brought back from Spain to form a new government.

Downfall: 1966–1968 

Al-Razzaz, Aflaq's successor as secretary general, came from the pro-Aflaq faction. With the defection of al-Hafez, he ordered that the National Command was the de jure ruling body of the Ba'ath Party. He appointed al-Bitar Prime Minister, Umran defence minister, Mansur al-Atrash as Chairman of the National Council of the Revolutionary Command and al-Hafiz retained his post as President of Syria. Salah Jadid, the Military Committee's strongman, responded by arresting several Umran supporters. Umran responded by dismissing a handful of pro-Jadid officials. The most important of these dismissals was the removal of Ahmad Suwaydani from the post of head of the country's military intelligence to head of the Officer Administration. On 23 February a coup d'état led by Jadid and Hafez al-Assad overthrew the Syrian Government and the Ba'ath Party leadership. Aflaq was exiled from Syria, and ordered never to return his homeland. Members of the party's other factions fled; Aflaq was captured and detained, along with other pro-Aflaq supporters, in a government guest house. When the new rulers launched a purge in August that year, Aflaq managed to make his escape, with the help of Nasim Al Safarjalani and Malek Bashour, both closely trusted friends and colleagues, and hence was able to flee to Beirut, Lebanon, and later to Brazil.

Aflaq's downfall caused a split within the Ba'ath Party; the party was de facto dissolved and two Ba'ath Parties were established, one Iraqi-led Ba'ath Party and one Syrian-led Ba'ath Party. The Syrian-led party was led by Jadid and his supporters and hailed Zaki al-Arsuzi, the founder of the Arab Ba'ath in 1940, as the father of Ba'athist thought, while the Iraqi-led party led by Ahmed Hassan al-Bakr and Saddam Hussein, still proclaimed Aflaq to be the founder of Ba'athist thought. In February 1966 at the Ninth National Congress, held after the coup which ousted the pro-Aflaq faction, the Iraqi delegation split with the Syrian Ba'athists. The Iraqis held the true Ninth National Congress in February 1968 in Beirut, and elected Aflaq as Secretary General of the National Command. Aflaq's election to the secretary generalship also proved to be his final break with al-Bitar; before the congress convened al-Bitar announced that he had left the Ba'ath Party and given up on the Ba'athist movement as a whole.

Iraqi-led Ba'ath Party: 1968–1989 

Aflaq moved to Baghdad following his reelection to the secretary generalship in February 1968. He stayed there until 1970, when Black September happened, he criticized the Ba'ath leadership of doing too little to help the Palestine Liberation Organisation during the conflict. During the conflict, Aflaq lobbied extensively for Yasser Arafat and the PLO. Aflaq wanted Iraqi intervention; al-Bakr, however, refused to get Iraq involved in such a conflict. Because of this, Aflaq returned to Lebanon in self-imposed exile. The government of Hafez al-Assad, the President of Syria, condemned Aflaq to death in absentia in 1971.

Later life and death 
After four years of self-imposed exile Aflaq returned to Iraq in 1974, a year before the Lebanese Civil War broke out. He refrained from taking part in Iraqi politics. He published several works during this period, the most notable being The Struggle Against Distorting the Movement of Arab Revolution in 1975. Aflaq regained some of his influence when he befriended Saddam Hussein, President of Iraq from 1979 until 2003. During the Iran–Iraq War the Iranian leadership accused Hussein of being under the control of a Christian, and Aflaq himself was labelled "a Christian infidel". Effectively, throughout his tenure as secretary general in Iraq, Aflaq was given all due honour as the founder of the Ba'ath movement, but on policy-making, he was ignored.

Aflaq died on 23 June 1989 in Paris, after undergoing heart surgery there.

Alleged conversion to Islam 

Saddam Hussein claimed that Aflaq converted to Islam before his death. According to anonymous Western diplomats, Aflaq's own family disagreed with that claim - however, Aflaq's son, Iyad, confirmed that his father thought about conversion in 1980. Upon his disputed conversion, he supposedly adopted "Ahmad" as a first name. According to the German orientalists Martin Robbe and Gerhard Höpp, the conversion happened before 1988. Regardless of the disagreements about his religion, he was given an Islamic funeral. According to the Berkley Center, anonymous members of Aflaq's family claimed that Aflaq's conversion was a lie made up by Saddam Hussein which he used as a tool to distance Ba'athism from Christianity. The tomb constructed on the orders of Hussein was later used as a military barrack by American soldiers after the 2003 American invasion of Iraq for troops stationed within the Green Zone.  Aflaq's family reported that the tomb was badly damaged during the invasion.

Memory and legacy 

Upon his death in 1989 he was given a state funeral. A large tomb and mausoleum were erected to form a shrine for him. The tomb, widely regarded as a work of great artistic merit, designed by Iraqi architect Chadagee, was located on the western grounds of the Ba'ath Party Pan-Arab Headquarters, at the intersection of Al-Kindi street and the Qādisiyyah Expressway overpass. Although there were rumors and accusations that his tomb was destroyed during the 2003 Iraq War, the burial chamber and building above it were left untouched. Its blue-tiled dome can be seen above the concrete T-walls surrounding the Camp's perimeter.

Thought

"Unity, liberty, socialism" 

The Arab Socialist Ba'ath Party slogan "Unity, liberty, socialism" is the key tenet of Aflaq's and Ba'athist thought. Unity meant the unification of the Arab people into one nation, the Arab Nation. The creation of an Arab Nation would have direct implications on Arab development. The establishment of this new state would lead to an Arab Ba'ath (literally meaning "Renaissance"). The Arab nations of his time could only progressively "decline" if not unified; these nations had various ailments – "feudalism, sectarianism, regionalism, intellectual reactionism". The only way to "cure" the Arab nations was, according to Aflaq, through a revolutionary movement. Aflaq was influenced by Marxism in that he saw the need for a vanguard party to rule the Arab Nation for an indefinite period of time (the period would be a transition from the old to the new).

The need for liberty was one of the defining features of Ba'athism, however, liberty not in the sense used by liberal democracies. Aflaq was a strong believer in pluralism of thought, but paradoxically, against pluralism in the form of votes. In theory, the Ba'ath Party would rule, and guide the people, in a transitional period of time without consulting the people because the party knew what was right.

The last tenet, 'socialism', did not mean socialism as it is defined in the West, but rather a unique form of Arab socialism. Aflaq coined the word Arab socialism for his variant of socialism. Socialism, in its original form in the Arab world had, according to Aflaq, first come into being under the rule of Muhammad. The point of Arab socialism was not to answer questions such as: how much state control was necessary, or economic equality; but instead Arab socialism was a system that freed the Arab people from oppression and enslavement, which in turn created independent individuals.

Aflaq opposed Marx's view that dialectical materialism was the only truth, but believed that the "importance of material economic conditions in life" was one of the greatest discoveries in modern history. Even so, Aflaq was critical of both capitalism and communism, and did not want either of the two power blocs to collapse during the Cold War – believing that the Cold War was a sort of check and balance on their power.

Role of Islam 

What Aflaq saw in Islam was a revolutionary movement. In contrast to other nationalities, the Arab awakening and expansion was attributed to a religious message. Because of this, Aflaq believed that the Arabs' spirituality was directly linked to Islam, therefore, one could never take Islam out of the equation of what is essentially, and essentially is not, Arab. Arab nationalism, just as Islam had been during the lifetime of Muhammad, was a spiritual revolutionary movement, leading the Arabs towards a new renaissance: Arab nationalism was the second revolution to appear in the Arab world. All Arab religious communities should, according to Aflaq, respect and worship the spirituality of Islam, even if they did not worship Islam in a religious sense – Aflaq was a Christian who worshipped Islam. Aflaq did not believe it was necessary to worship Muhammad, but believed that all Arabs should strive to emulate Muhammad. In the words of Aflaq himself, Arabs "belong to the nation that gave birth to a Muhammad; or rather, because this Arab individual is a member of the community which Muhammad put all his efforts into creating […] Muhammad was all the Arabs; let us today make all the Arabs Muhammad." The Muslim of Muhammad's days were, according to Aflaq, synonymous with Arabs – the Arabs were the only ones to preach the message of Islam during Muhammad's lifetime. In contrast to Jesus, who was a religious leader, but not a political leader, Muhammad was both – the first leader of Islam and of the Arab world. Therefore, secularisation could not take the same shape in the Arab world as it did in the West.

Aflaq called on all Arabs, both Muslim and non-Muslim alike, to admire the role Islam had played in creating the Arab character. But his view on Islam was purely spiritual, and Aflaq emphasised that Islam "should not be imposed" on state and society. Time and again Aflaq emphasised that the Ba'ath party was against atheism, but also equally against fundamentalism. For him, any fundamentalism represented a "shallow, false faith." According to Ba'athist ideology, all religions were equal. Despite his anti-atheist stance, Aflaq was a strong supporter of secular government, and stated that a Ba'athist state would replace religion with a state "based on a foundation – Arab nationalism, and a moral – freedom."

Legacy 

Fouad Ajami criticised Aflaq for a lack of real substance, stating, "Nearly three hundred pages of text yield no insight, on his part, into what went wrong and what needed to be done; there is only the visible infatuation with words" and "Aflaq summons the party to renounce power and go back to its 'pure essence'". There is some truth in this critique. Aflaq spent much time and energy writing optimistically about the future, and the past, of the Arab Nation, and of how the Arab World could be unified. As Kanan Makiya, the author of Republic of Fear: The Politics of Modern Iraq, notes: for "Aflaq, reality is confined to the inner world of the party." In contrast to other philosophers, such as Karl Marx or John Locke, Aflaq's ideological view of the world makes no clear stand on the materialistic or socioeconomic behavior of humanity. While other philosophers make distinctions between what is real and what is not real, that is between prescriptive and descriptive analysis, Aflaq did not as a rule define what is and what ought to be.  In his thought both are molded into the same category: that which is attainable.

In contrast to his longtime friend and colleague Salah al-Din al-Bitar, who was more practical when it came to politics, Aflaq was a "visionary, the dreamer rather unfitted for political life". Aflaq was described by his associates as an "ascetic, shy and intense figure living a simple and unpretentious life." He has been accused of seeking help from other people instead of fulfilling his goal by himself or with others he led; Aflaq collaborated with Gamal Abdel Nasser, Abd al-Karim Qasim and Abdul Rahman Arif in 1958, to Ahmed Hassan al-Bakr and Ali Salih al-Sadi in 1963 and finally in the 1970s to Saddam Hussein. There are several Ba'athists, mostly from the Syrian-led Ba'ath Party, who believe Aflaq stole Ba'athist ideology from its original founder, Zaki al-Arsuzi. These individuals have denounced, and labelled, Aflaq as a "thief".

In his writings Aflaq had been stridently in favor of free speech and other human rights and aid for the lower classes. During the Military Committee's gradual take over of power in Syria, Aflaq rallied against what he saw as the establishment of a military dictatorship, instead of the democracy for which Aflaq had planned. These ideals were never realized by the governments that used his ideology. Most scholars see the Assad government in Syria and Saddam Hussein's government in Iraq to have only employed Aflaq's ideology as a pretense for dictatorship.

Selected works 
 في سبيل البعث  (English: On the Way of Resurrection, published 1947)
 Itihad Souriyya wa Misr (English: Unity Between Syria and Egypt, published 1958)
 Ma'rakat al-Masir al-Wahid (English: The Battle for One Destiny, published 1958)
 Nuqtat al-Bidayya (English: The Starting Point, published 1971)
 Al-Ba'ath wa al-Wihda (English: The Ba'ath and Arab Unity, published 1972)
 Al-Ba'ath wa al-Ishtirakiyya (English: The Ba'ath and Socialism, published 1973)
 Al-Nidal did Tashweeh Harakat al-Thawra al-Arabiyya (English: The Struggle Against Distorting the Movement of Arab Revolution, published 1975)

Notes and references

Notes

References

Bibliography

External links 

 Michel Aflak: Choice of Texts
 Iraqi-led Arab Socialist Ba'ath Party (in Arabic)

1910 births
1989 deaths
Ba'athism
Syrian Arab nationalists
20th-century Syrian writers
Critics of atheism
People from Damascus
Arab Socialist Ba'ath Party – Iraq Region politicians
Arab Socialist Ba'ath Party – Syria Region politicians
Greek Orthodox Christians from Syria
20th-century Syrian philosophers
Political philosophers
Social philosophers
Syrian sociologists
Syrian anti-communists
University of Paris alumni
Members of the National Command of the Ba'ath Party
Members of the National Command of the Ba'ath Party (Iraqi-dominated faction)
Political party founders
Syrian secularists
Syrian political philosophers
Members of the Fabian Society
20th-century Syrian politicians
Syrian schoolteachers
Syrian expatriates in France